Pygmy rattler is a common name for two species of snakes:

 Sistrurus miliarius, a.k.a. the pigmy rattlesnake, a venomous pitviper found in North America
 Sistrurus catenatus, a.k.a. the massasauga, another venomous pitviper found in North America